Daniel Eugene "Danny" Walters (born November 4, 1960) is a former American Football cornerback for the San Diego Chargers of the National Football League (NFL).  Walters played college football for the University of Arkansas, in Fayetteville, and he was chosen by the San Diego Chargers in the fourth round of the 1983 NFL Draft.

Early years
Walters was born on November 4, 1960 in Prescott, Arkansas. He graduated primary school at Julian High School in Chicago, Illinois, and college at the University of Arkansas in Fayetteville. From 1979 - 1982, he played football in the SWC where he is credited with 148 yards Rushing, 117 yards Receiving, 28 yards Passing, 7 Interceptions, and 2 Touchdowns for the Razorbacks. During Walters time with the Razorbacks, Lou Holtz was their head coach.

Professional career
Walters was drafted by the San Diego Chargers in the fourth round, 95th overall pick, of the 1983 NFL Draft and held a starting position with them from 1983 to 1987.  During Walters time with the Chargers, Don Coryell and Al Saunders were their head coaches.

Arrest and aftermath
On Sept. 14, 1987, Walters was pulled over by police when his car was weaving. He was arrested and charged with possession of cocaine and driving under the influence of alcohol or a controlled substance. Two months later, the cocaine charge was suspended pending his completion of a drug education program. He was fined $750 for driving under the influence and ordered to complete 20 hours of community service.

In a December 11, 1987 interview with Bill Plaschke, LA Times Staff Writer, Walters said, "For a while, I tried to convince myself that this was a bad dream. Then I called my father (Herbert), who told me, 'Treat this like a bad play, like you just got beat. Forget about it.'" Walters frowned. "If only that's all this was."

Walters' conviction and a series of missed practices brought an end to his NFL career. The Chargers released him from his contract in 1988.

See also

IMD - Danny Walters on 'Monday Night Football'

References

External links
 Official website of the Arkansas Razorbacks
 Official website of the San Diego Chargers

1960 births
Living people
People from Prescott, Arkansas
Players of American football from Arkansas
American football cornerbacks
Arkansas Razorbacks football players
San Diego Chargers players